The Stade de l’Amitié sino-gabonaise is a stadium in Angondjé, a suburb of Libreville in Gabon. It is referred to as Stade de l'Amitié. The stadium build was expected to take 20 months and was funded by the Gabonese and Chinese governments.

It was one of four stadiums used for the 2012 Africa Cup of Nations and hosted the competition final. The inaugural football match played here was Gabon facing off against Brazil. Brazil won that match 2–0.

The symbolic laying of the foundation stone was made by the Gabonese Sports Minister Rene Ndemezo’Obiang and the Chinese Vice Minister Fu Ziying in April 2010. This stadium was constructed by China, and built on a 30-hectare area by the Chinese company Shanghai Construction Group. The work was entirely funded by China while Gabon developed the site, including bringing water and electricity, and building access roads.

It was one of four Gabonese stadia used for the 2017 Africa Cup of Nations and hosted the competition's final.

Notes

Sports venues completed in 2010
Football venues in Gabon
2012 Africa Cup of Nations
Buildings and structures in Libreville
Sport in Libreville
2017 Africa Cup of Nations stadiums